Dobra is a village in the municipality of Golubac, Serbia. According to the 2002 census, the village has a population of 678 people.

References

External links 
 Old pictures from Dobra village in years 1915-1920

Populated places in Braničevo District